A national day is a day on which celebrations mark the nationhood of a nation or state. It may be the date of independence, of becoming a republic, of becoming a federation, or a significant date for a patron saint or a ruler (such as a birthday, accession, or removal). The national day is often a public holiday. Many countries have more than one national day. Denmark and the United Kingdom are the only two countries without a national day. National days emerged with the age of nationalism, with most appearing during the 19th and 20th century.

List of national days

Nations that are not broadly recognized sovereign states are shown in pink. Defunct states are highlighted in light grey. For nations that are dependent on, or part of, a sovereign state (such as federal states, autonomous regions, or colonies), the name of the sovereign state is shown in parentheses.

Days that are not fixed to the Gregorian calendar are sorted by their occurrences.

See also

 Public holiday
 Flag Day
 Independence Day
 Liberation Day
 Civil religion
 Fête nationale
 Republic Day
 Victory Day

References

 
Lists of observances
Types of national holidays
January observances
February observances
March observances
April observances
May observances
June observances
July observances
August observances
September observances
October observances
November observances
December observances
Holidays and observances by scheduling (nth weekday of the month)
Day